Spatial and Spatio-temporal Epidemiology is a quarterly peer-reviewed medical journal covering spatial and spatiotemporal aspects of epidemiology. It was established in 2009 and is published by Elsevier. The editor-in-chief is Andrew Lawson (Medical University of South Carolina).

Abstracting and indexing
The journal is abstracted and indexed in:
EBSCOhost
Embase
Index Medicus/MEDLINE/PubMed
Scopus

References

External links

Epidemiology journals
Publications established in 2009
Elsevier academic journals
English-language journals
Quarterly journals